Philodoria pipturiella is a moth of the family Gracillariidae. It was first described by Otto Herman Swezey in 1923. It is endemic to the Hawaiian island of Oahu.

The larvae feed on Pipturus species. They mine the leaves of their host plant. Large leaves can contain up to a hundred mines. The cocoons are made on the underside of the leaf alongside a prominent vein. They are white and not very conspicuous.

External links

Philodoria
Endemic moths of Hawaii